Yarazari is a village in Muddebihal taluk of Bijapur district in Karnataka state. The nearest towns are Muddebihal, Nidagundi, Basavana Bagewadi, Talikoti, Vijapur and Bagalkot.

Yarazari has a mata called Yallalingeshwar Mata and Dhyamavva (Durga Devi) temple.

Rahul Yarazari 
Its mainly a flat land with black and red soil, most of the land is well irrigated because of Krishna river left branch water canal. farming is the main source of income. The main vegetation are jawar, sunflower, wheat, maze, ground nuts and many oil seeds.

References

Villages in Bijapur district, Karnataka